The Charles W. Stribley House is located in Kaukauna, Wisconsin, United States.  It was built in 1910.  It was a work of architects Van Ryn & DeGelleke. It was added to the National Register of Historic Places for its architectural significance in 1984.

The 1945-built Casa Rio, in Florida, also known as the S.W. Stribley House, is another work by Van Ryn & DeGelleke, and is their only NRHP-listed work outside of Wisconsin.

References

Houses in Outagamie County, Wisconsin
Houses completed in 1910
Houses on the National Register of Historic Places in Wisconsin
Romanesque Revival architecture in Wisconsin
National Register of Historic Places in Outagamie County, Wisconsin